The Stockholm tramway network forms part of the public transport system in Stockholm, the capital city of Sweden.

Beginning with horse trams in 1877, the Stockholm tram network reached its largest extent in 1946. Many of the former suburban tram lines became parts of the Stockholm Metro between the years 1950-1964. In September 1967, in conjunction with the Swedish switch from left-hand to right-hand traffic, the last parts of the once large inner city street running tram network were closed. What little remained of the former network following 1967 were isolated suburban feeder lines to the Metro.

History
The first tramway in Stockholm was opened on 10 July 1877 and was drawn by horses. A tramline run on steam-power opened in 1887. Stockholm's tram network was converted to electrical propulsion 1901-1905. An extensive network formed in the early 20th century. Trams were effectively replaced by the Stockholm Metro from 1950 onwards, and most tram lines were closed down by September 1967 due to the effect of Dagen H and replaced with buses (especially those in Stockholm proper), with the exception of two suburban tram lines, Lidingöbanan and Nockebybanan.

In 1991, one tram line, Djurgårdslinjen, was reopened as a heritage and tourist line. Since 2000, two more tram lines have been built, Tvärbanan (line 22), a peripheral line linking the southeastern suburb of Sickla with the northwestern suburb of Solna, and an extension of Djurgårdslinjen into the inner city Spårväg City (line 7). The Tvärbana was extended in 2013, and will be further extended in the future.

Current service 
As of January 2023, the following lines provide service in the Stockholm metropolitan area:

While all tramlines run on standard gauge track and use the same overhead voltage (750 V DC), the cab signalling system for Lidingöbanan is different from the one for Tvärbanan, making rolling stock incompatible. The other tramlines (Nockeby and City/Djurgården) have no cab signalling requirement.

Gallery

See also

Stockholm metro
Public transport in Stockholm
List of town tramway systems in Europe

External links

 AB Storstockholms Lokaltrafik 
 AB Storstockholms Lokaltrafik 
 Tram.se - Stockholm tramway lines 
 Track plan of the Stockholm tram system)
 SL site with maps of lines 

Rail transport in Stockholm
Stockholm
Stockholm
1877 establishments in Sweden